The Bacon River is a river on Cornwallis Island in the Qikiqtaaluk Region of Nunavut, Canada.

See also
List of rivers of Nunavut
Geography of Nunavut

References

Rivers of Qikiqtaaluk Region